Vermont Route 315 (VT 315) is a  state highway located within the town of Rupert in Bennington County, Vermont, United States. It connects VT 153 in Rupert to VT 30 in the village of East Rupert. The entirety of VT 315 is maintained by the town of Rupert.

Route description

VT 315 begins in the west at an intersection with VT 153.  VT 153 southbound from this intersection provides a connection with New York State Route 22 and also runs northbound, paralleling the state border with New York to provide a more northerly connection with NY 22.  VT 315 proceeds to the east, running through a generally isolated area, and ending at VT 30 in East Rupert.

Major intersections

References

External links

315
Transportation in Bennington County, Vermont